Salvia ophiocephala is an annual herb that is endemic to Bolivia—as of 2007 there was only known to be one small colony growing in a Yungas forest valley at  elevation. The site is close to settlements and gold-mining, and therefore the plant is considered critically endangered. The specific epithet, ophiocephala, refers to the distinctive teeth in the calyx mouth which hints at the open mouth of a striking rattlesnake. It appears to be related to Salvia personata.

The inflorescence of simple racemes, with as many as 12 verticillasters that are 4–6-flowered, vary in length. The  corolla is dirty white with blue lips, held in a calyx whose veins extend as teeth.

Notes

ophiocephala
Flora of Bolivia